The 1840 United States presidential election in Mississippi took place between October 30 and December 2, 1840, as part of the 1840 United States presidential election. Voters chose four representatives, or electors to the Electoral College, who voted for President and Vice President.

Mississippi voted for the Whig candidate, William Henry Harrison, over Democratic candidate Martin Van Buren. Harrison won Mississippi by a margin of 6.86%. As of 2020, this is the only presidential election in American history in which Mississippi has voted for a different candidate than Alabama.

Results

References

Mississippi
1840
1840 Mississippi elections